New York's 134th State Assembly district is one of the 150 districts in the New York State Assembly. It has been represented by Josh Jensen since 2021.

Geography 
District 134 is located entirely within Monroe County, comprising communities west of Rochester. It includes the towns of Greece, Ogden, and Parma and the villages of Spencerport and Hilton.

Recent election results

2022

2020

2018

2016

2014

2012

2010

References

134
Monroe County, New York